Kodacolor is a brand-name owned and used by Kodak. In general, it has been used for three technologically distinct purposes:

 Kodacolor Technology is the collective branding used for several proprietary inkjet printer technologies.
 Kodacolor (still photography) includes several "true" color negative (print) films produced by Kodak since 1942.
 Kodacolor (filmmaking) was an early movie system that used filters to record additive color on monochromatic lenticular film.

Kodak

de:Kodak Kodacolor